Simon Farine (born March 21, 1987) is a Canadian basketball player who currently plays for Ironi Kiryat Ata of the Israeli Super League.

Early life and high school career
Farine was born in Toronto, Ontario.  Playing for the powerhouse Northern Secondary School Red Knights, Farine was a three-sport star (basketball, football, and baseball). On the court, he excelled and was named the MVP of the Nike All Canada Basketball Camp in 2004, and in 2005 was named Northern Secondary School Athlete of the Year and a Toronto Star Basketball All Star.

College career

NCAA
After mulling offers from Division I schools such as Davidson, Boston University, and Colgate, Farine committed to the Wisconsin-Green Bay Phoenix to start his college career. Appearing in 27 games he averaged 1.4 ppg in limited action.

CIS

2007–08 season
After one year at Wisconsin-Green Bay, Farine decided to transfer to the Dalhousie Tigers of the CIS where he felt he would be able to develop more with increased playing time. After redshirting the 06–07 season, Farine averaged 15.9 ppg, 5.0 ast, 5.8 reb, but was not satisfied by his team's overall performance.

2008–09 season
He followed the 07–08 season with the best season yet in 08-09, averaging 19.1 ppg, 4.5 ast, and 5.3 reb, while shooting 43.6% from the field and 38.5% from three-point range. Averaging 29.7 pts, 7.7 rebs, and 6.0 ast a game in the playoffs, Farine led his Dalhousie Tiger's to the school's first AUS Championship in 13 years, scoring 45 pts in the championship game, setting an AUS playoff scoring record, and taking home the tournament's Most Valuable Player Award.

2009–10 season
Farine put together another big year in the 09–10 season, leading the Dalhousie Tigers by averaging 21.9 pts, 6.5 reb, and 5.5 ast. Simon had an impressive assist to turnover ratio of 3.09, and was 3rd in steals with over 2 a game. The Tigers could not repeat as AUS champions as they lost to Cape Breton in the semi-finals.

2010–11 season
Going into his last season with the Tigers, Farine appeared in all 20 games and averaged 36 minutes a game. With season averages of 19.1 ppg, 6.4 reb, and 4.5 ast, he led the Dalhousie Tigers to their second AUS Championship in the last 3 years. He was named Tournament MVP, as well as the Player of the Game in the Championship game, where he scored 24 points. Farine was named a CIS All-Canadian, and First Team AUS All Star. Simon scored 1,452 regular season points over his career at Dalhousie, making him the second leading scorer in Tiger's history.

Professional career

Maccabi Haifa
Farine decided to play professionally for the 2011–12 season. Following a June tryout in South Florida, Simon signed a two-year deal with Maccabi Haifa of the Israeli Super League. Head coach Mickey Gorka said: “We were very impressed with Simon Farine in the U.S. tryouts, Simon shined amongst excellent competition at the U.S. tryouts. He’s a physical guard, strong rebounder, with a nice touch from mid-range and will add depth to our roster this season."

Farine struggled to get consistent playing time in his first professional season, as Haifa had numerous veteran guards ahead of him. Appearing in 16 games, he averaged 11 minutes a game, scoring 2.3 ppg.

Hapoel Tivon Megiddo
Farine headed back to Israel for the 2012–2013 season excited at the opportunity his new team presented. Shortly after signing with Hapoel Tivon Megiddo, Farine said “Last season I gained invaluable experience practicing and playing with some elite players in Haifa, I am excited to be going back to Israel and I am ready to make an immediate impact with Tivon Megiddo this season.”

Farine had a reason to be excited at the opportunity in Tivon, as he went on to start all 31 games and rank 3rd in the league in minutes per game at 35.9. While the team had an inconsistent season finishing with a record of 8–18, Farine was a steady contributor. Showing his continued development, Farine went on to average 15.5 pts, 4.6 reb, 3.8 ast, and 1.4 stls. While Farine would have hoped his team would have had more success, he showed his ability to be a premier scorer in the league by leading Tivon-Megiddo to four wins in their final six regular season games, averaging 17.3 pts over that span.

Ironi Kiryat Ata
Farine decided to continue his professional career in Israel by signing a one-year contract with Ironi Kiryat Ata of the Israeli National League. Joining a team that was aggressively chasing a promotion to Israel's first division was very attractive to Farine. After two seasons playing in Israel, Farine had his sights set on winning a league championship. Once his signing was made official he spoke about his new team saying “I am thrilled to be joining Ironi Kiryat Ata this fall, it is a great organization from top to bottom and I think we have a real shot to win it all.”

Professional career statistics

2009 Macabbi Games
Simon traveled with the Macabbi Team Canada basketball team to the 2009 Maccabiah Games (the "Jewish Olympics"), held in Israel in July 2009. Captaining a relatively inexperienced team, Farine took charge by leading the tournament in scoring.  Facing the U.S. team in the semifinals, Farine and his teammates went up against a team full of professional and Division I players. Coached by former Tennessee Head Coach Bruce Pearl, the U.S. team had no answer for Farine as he faced little resistance on his way to scoring 31 points. Unfortunately, it was not enough to stop the U.S. team from defeating Canada in the semi-finals. Losing only to Israel and the United States, Canada came away with a very respectable 3rd-place finish. Canada's Head coach John Dore spoke to the media about Farine's role to the team saying; "Simon was our best player and his game is off the charts right now. He was unbelievable against the Americans."

References

1987 births
Living people
Canadian expatriate basketball people in the United States
Canadian men's basketball players
Dalhousie University alumni
Green Bay Phoenix men's basketball players
Ironi Kiryat Ata players
Ironi Nahariya players
Jewish men's basketball players
Jewish Canadian sportspeople
Maccabiah Games bronze medalists for Canada
Maccabi Haifa B.C. players
Basketball players from Toronto
Maccabiah Games medalists in basketball
Guards (basketball)